Letouzeya is a genus of ground beetles in the family Carabidae. There are at least two described species in Letouzeya, found in Cameroon.

Species
These two species belong to the genus Letouzeya:
 Letouzeya mirabilis Bruneau de Miré, 1982
 Letouzeya spectabilis Bruneau de Miré, 1982

References

Platyninae